St Saviour's GAA Club is a football and hurling club founded in 1980 in Ballybeg, Waterford, in the Republic of Ireland.

Facilities 
The club's facilities include a clubhouse, dressing rooms, gym, and floodlit training area. Construction is almost complete on a wall behind one of the goals, with ball-stoppers due to be installed behind each goal.

Honours 
The club has won almost every honour in the county. The club's early years included several wins in under-age "A" grades. While not as successful during the 1990s, the club won the County Senior Football title for the first time ever. Later victories include U-16 county titles in both hurling and football.

 Waterford Senior Football Championships (1): 1998 (runners-up 1988)
 Waterford Intermediate Football Championships (1): 1987
 Waterford Intermediate Hurling Championships (1): 1991
 Waterford Minor Football Championships (2): 1986, 1987
 Waterford Under-21 Football Championships (1): 1988
 Waterford Minor Hurling Championships (1): 1993

External links
 Official St Saviour's GAA Club website
 Hoganstand article on club

Gaelic games clubs in County Waterford
Hurling clubs in County Waterford
Gaelic football clubs in County Waterford